Harold Stone may refer to:
 Harold J. Stone, American actor
 Harold S. Stone, American computer scientist